Sink or Swim is a BBC TV sitcom created and written by Alex Shearer. It ran for three series between 4 December 1980 and 14 October 1982 and stars Peter Davison as Brian Webber and Robert Glenister as his brother Steve.

Brian lives in a flat above a petrol station in London (in the last series he moved to Newcastle to attend university). He's trying hard to make his way in the world, thus far with limited success. His girlfriend, Sonia, is a very serious minded young woman who is passionate only about things like vegetarianism and ecology. When Brian's younger brother, Steve, arrives in London looking for somewhere to stay, his lazy, cynical, noisy "Northern lout" attitude disrupts Brian's already messy life.

Like Only Fools and Horses, Sink or Swim was filmed in Bristol doubling for London. Shearer later wrote the Nicholas Lyndhurst sitcom The Two of Us for LWT. Production of the sitcom overlapped the first two years of Davison also starring as the Fifth Doctor in Doctor Who, which imposed constraints on the recording schedules.

Cast
Peter Davison – Brian Webber
Robert Glenister – Steve Webber
Sara Corper – Sonia
Amanda Orton – Sandra (series 1 & 2)
Ron Pember – Mike Connor (series 1 & 2)
Gillian Taylforth – Christine (series 2)
Briony McRoberts – Charlotte (series 3)
Russell Wootton – Douglas (series 3)

References

External links

1980 British television series debuts
1980s British sitcoms
1982 British television series endings
BBC television sitcoms
English-language television shows